The Open English Bible (OEB) is a freely redistributable modern translation based on the Twentieth Century New Testament translation. A work in progress, with its first publication in August 2010, the OEB is edited and distributed by Russell Allen.  It is licensed with a Creative Commons zero license, which allows free use of the content and allows forking of the content and a new translation to be made based on it.  Its name and the distribution of all text and related software through GitHub reinforce the open source approach.

History and textual basis 

The OEB is a modern translation created by editing the Twentieth Century New Testament translation, and derived from the Greek Wescott-Hort text. The OEB aims to be a "scholarly defensible mainstream translation", which is intended "not to push any particular theological line". The reading level of the OEB "[corresponds] roughly to the NEB/REB or NRSV", that is, High School reading level. The OEB's initial release was in August 2010, although a preview of the Book of Mark was released in March 2010.

Copyright status 
The Open English Bible's copyright was held by Russell Allen, its author. It has been released into the public domain under a Creative Commons zero license with modified versions distributed  under a different name. The OEB has been described as an "open source" translation.

The OEB is available online in html or using BibleWebApp.com software, or it can be downloaded in various formats.

See also
 World English Bible – A public domain translation of the Bible, based on the Majority Text)
 New English Translation – An online translation

Notes

References

Further reading
  – This book uses the Open English Bible, see page xx.

External links 
 
 Open English Bible Source on GitHub
 

2010 non-fiction books
Bible translations into English
2010 in Christianity